Thriophora is a genus of moth in the family Gelechiidae. It contains the species Thriophora ovulata, which is found in South Africa (Gauteng).

The wingspan is about 12 mm. The forewings are ochreous-white, sprinkled with black points and with a rather large suffused roundish ferruginous-ochreous spot sprinkled with black in the disc at one-fifth. There are three similar spots representing the stigmata, the plical slightly before the first discal, much more irrorated with black than the others. There is also a similarly coloured terminal fascia, broadest towards the costa. Some slight irregular pale ferruginous-ochreous suffusion is scattered elsewhere about the disc. The hindwings are ochreous-whitish.

References

Endemic moths of South Africa
Gelechiinae